James Peterson is an American  writer and cookery teacher.  He studied chemistry at the University of California at Berkeley.

After traveling the world and moving to Paris, he apprenticed at Paris' Cordon Bleu. He worked at Le Vivarois, then moved to Vonnas to work at Chez La Mere Blanc (now Restaurant Georges Blanc).

In 1979, he returned to New York City, becoming a partner at Greenwich Village's Le Petit Robert.  Starting in 1984, he taught for four years at the French Culinary Institute, where he wrote the advanced curriculum.

His first book, Sauces, written in 1990, won an award for best single subject and the Cookbook of the Year Award from the James Beard Foundation. He went on to write 14 more cookbooks and win an additional five James Beard Awards, making for seven in all. Peterson is responsible for virtually all the photography in his books.

Since 2011, James has been studying perfumes in his home laboratory. In 2011, he launched Brooklyn Perfume Company. 

He resides today in Brooklyn, New York, where he is actively developing new perfumes and running a small business.

Books

 
 
 
 
 
  New printing.

Awards
 Winner, 1992 James Beard Foundation, Cookbook of the Year for Sauces
 Winner, 1992 James Beard Foundation, Single Subject Cookbook for Sauces
 Nominee, 1994 James Beard Foundation, for The Splendid Soup: Recipes and Master Techniques for Making the World's Best Soups
 Winner, 1997 International Association of Culinary Professionals, for Fish and Shellfish
 Nominee, 1997 James Beard Foundation, Single Subject Cookbook for Fish and Shellfish
 Winner, 1999 James Beard Foundation, Single Subject Cookbook for Vegetables.
 Nominee, 2000 International Association of Culinary Professionals, for Essentials of Cooking
 Nominee, 2000 James Beard Foundation, Reference Cookbook for Essentials of Cooking
 Winner, 2003 James Beard Foundation, Mediterranean Cookbook for 'Glorious French Food Winner, 2008 James Beard Foundation, General Cookbook for Cooking Winner, 2010 James Beard Foundation, Baking & Desserts Cookbook for Baking Winner, 2011 James Beard Foundation, Single Subject for Meat''

Notes

External links
 
 
 
 
 

Living people
American chefs
American food writers
University of California, Berkeley alumni
James Beard Foundation Award winners
Year of birth missing (living people)